is a UK labour law case, concerning collective bargaining.

Facts
The NUJ contended that its application for recognition at the Racing Post newspaper was not inadmissible under the Trade Union and Labour Relations (Consolidation) Act 1992, Schedule A1, paragraph 35. This prescribes that where a collective agreement is ‘already in force’ the procedure cannot take place. The Central Arbitration Committee had decided this was the situation since the Mirror News Group already had a recognition agreement with the British Association of Journalists. The BAJ formed in the early 1990s as a breakaway from the NUJ, but is independent and not affiliated to the Trades Union Congress. It signed an agreement for the Sports Division of the Mirror in 2003, shutting out the NUJ. They only had one member in the Sports Division. A majority of people in the bargaining unit were in favour of statutory recognition of the NUJ. The NUJ argued an agreement should not be considered ‘already in force’ for the purpose of paragraph 35, and in any case the CAC decision breached Article 11 of the European Convention on Human Rights and Article 14.

Judgment

High Court
Hodge J held there was no need to recognise the NUJ. He said the following.

Court of Appeal
Buxton LJ held that the smaller collective agreement prevented another one supervening. ‘Already in force’ should take its natural meaning, and it did not matter that collective agreements were not binding. Wilson v UK was considered, but the right to recognition did not fall within the scope of ECHR article 11. Just because one union had an agreement ahead of another did not mean the first suffered discrimination, so art 14 did not apply either.

Latham LJ and Nourse LJ agreed.

See also

UK labour law

Notes

References

United Kingdom labour case law
Court of Appeal (England and Wales) cases
2005 in British law
2005 in case law